Maria Manuela Dias Ferreira Leite GCC GCIH (born Lisbon, 3 December 1940), commonly known as Manuela Ferreira Leite, is a Portuguese economist, pundit and retired politician.

Background
She was born in Lisbon, Portugal.
Manuela Ferreira Leite comes from a family of many generations of famous lawyers, but she has chosen to follow finance and economics instead. Her brother José Eugénio Dias Ferreira is a Lisbon lawyer and a political commentator and sports commentator. She is a daughter of Carlos Eugénio Dias Ferreira (b. Lisbon, 18 May 1908), a Licentiate in Law from the Faculty of Law of the University of Lisbon and a lawyer, and wife Julieta Teixeira de Carvalho, a Licentiate in Engineering from the Instituto Superior Técnico of the Technical University of Lisbon and an engineer, daughter of José Teixeira de Carvalho and wife Etelvina Ferreira de Carvalho. Her paternal grandfather José Eugénio Dias Ferreira (Lisbon, 13 November 1882 – Lisbon, 17 January 1953) was also a lawyer from the University of Coimbra, being a natural son of Minister and Counselor José Dias Ferreira by an unknown mother.

She is a fifth cousin of her non-immediate predecessor Pedro Santana Lopes.

Career
She is a Licentiate in Finances from the ISEG - Instituto Superior de Economia e Gestão (formerly known as ISCEF - Instituto Superior de Ciências Económicas e Financeiras), a noted economics and finance school of the Technical University of Lisbon.

Manuela Ferreira Leite has in the past held several positions within the Portuguese government, including Minister of Education during Aníbal Cavaco Silva's cabinet between 1993 and 1995, and 112th Minister of State and Finances during Durão Barroso cabinets between 6 April 2002 and 2004. In both cases her politics of contention was targeted for its alleged excessiveness. In Education, as so many of her predecessors and successors but with worse opposition and manifestations, she had to deal with the issue of tuitions, which even though of low value remains hard to afford by many college students.
In 2006, she was non-executive administrator of the Portuguese Banco Santander Totta.

She was also, between 2006 and 2008, member of the Council of State, designated by the President of Portugal.

She was elected leader of the Social Democratic Party (PSD) on 31 May 2008, leading the party during the 2009 legislative elections. She was unable to defeat the Socialist Party led by José Sócrates, although achieving a slight increase in number of votes and seats. As leader of the major party outside the government, she was the Leader of the Opposition. She was succeeded as party leader by Pedro Passos Coelho on 9 April 2010.

After leaving PSD leadership she retired from active party politics (although she is still a member of the party). She currently has a weekly programme where she comments about politics and current affairs at the cable news channel TVI 24.

Personal life
She was married to Rui Leite, a Licentiate in Economics from the Instituto Superior de Ciências Económicas e Financeiras of the Technical University of Lisbon and an Economist, from whom she is now divorced and has three children:
 Nuno Dias Ferreira Leite, who married at the Church of Campo Grande in Campo Grande, Lisbon), on 6 July 2006 to Mónica da Cruz Rocha Campos and had two daughters: Marta Bessa Campos Ferreira Leite and Catarina Bessa Campos Ferreira Leite.
 João Dias Ferreira Leite
 Ana Dias Ferreira Leite, married at the Church of Santos in Santos-o-Velho, Lisbon, on 3 December 2005 to João Maria de Gouveia Durão de Quintanilha e Mendonça, born in Lisbon, Alvalade, on 3 November 1978, only son of three children of João Maria de Azevedo de Quintanilha e Mendonça (b. 17 May 1952) and wife Maria Joana Guizado de Gouveia Durão, and had issue:
 Maria Ferreira Leite de Quintanilha e Mendonça (b. London, Middlesex, 24 April 2006)
 João Maria Ferreira Leite de Quintanilha e Mendonça (b. London, Middlesex, 30 May 2008)
 Vasco Ferreira Leite de Quintanilha e Mendonca (b. London, Middlesex, 17 September 2012)

Honours
  Grand Cross of the Order of Prince Henry, Portugal (6 March 1998)
  Grand-Cross of the Order of Christ, Portugal (10 June 2011)

Electoral history

PSD leadership election, 2008

  (Source: Official results)

References

Manuela Ferreira Leite on the Portuguese Ministry of Education website
Manuela Ferreira Leite personal website

|-

|-

|-

1940 births
Living people
Portuguese women economists
People from Lisbon
20th-century Portuguese economists
Social Democratic Party (Portugal) politicians
Finance ministers of Portugal
Technical University of Lisbon alumni
Education ministers of Portugal
Women government ministers of Portugal
Female finance ministers
21st-century Portuguese women politicians
21st-century Portuguese politicians
20th-century Portuguese women politicians